London Buses heritage routes may refer to:
 London Buses route 9 (Heritage)
 London Buses route 15 (Heritage)